The Mayor of the Township of Langley is the official head and chief executive officer of Langley Township, British Columbia. Since 1967, the mayor has been elected for a three-year term; previously, township reeves were elected for one-year terms. The 10th and current mayor is Jack Froese.

References 

Langley City